The following is a list of characters in the anime series Immortal Grand Prix.

Team Satomi
Team Satomi is a team and crew of young rookies from the United States of America who have just won the minor league IG-2 Championship and are now entering the big leagues as an IG-1 team. This young and inexperienced group actually did achieve the impossible dream to go from complete obscurity to winning in the IG-1 not only once, but twice.

Team Satomi race record
In both seasons, Team Satomi begins with a 1–1–1 record and finishes with four victories, including a win in the final against the team that they previously lost to and tied with.

Pilots
Takeshi Jin ( in the Japanese version)

Position: Forward
Nationality:  American
Age: 17 years old
Gender: Male
Height: 169 cm
Weight: 56 kg
As Team Satomi's forward, Takeshi is a gifted pilot who frequently defeats Liz Ricarro when his talent gets to his head. Takeshi seems to take nothing seriously, but his determination is strong when racing and he is also a practitioner of kendo. He has an affinity for hot dogs and video games, particularly Watch World where his dog-like character is named Katana. Although Takeshi is a skilled pilot, he has an emotional breakdown from a blow to his ego. He, unlike his teammates, seems to have a normal family life, along with a younger sister named Yuri, who loves teasing her brother, and barging in on him without asking, though it is obvious that she loves her big brother dearly and she claims to be his biggest fan and supporter. Takeshi also looks to his idol, a famous IGPX pilot known as Rocket G, or simply "The Rocket", as a source of inspiration. The Rocket is later revealed to be Team Satomi's coach Andrei Rublev. Takeshi was an item with Fantine Valjean and met with her at times when playing Watch World; however, in season 2, they broke up. Fantine realized that Takeshi and Liz have feelings for each other and thought of Takeshi as a friendly rival rather than a boyfriend. He also matures throughout the series, and in the final episode Takeshi and Liz admit their feelings for each other.

Position: Defender
Nationality:  American
Age: 17 years old
Gender: Female
Height: 172 cm
Weight: 50 kg
An orphan whose only family is her teammates and her coaches, Liz is Team Satomi's defender. Very loud, busty and hot-tempered she generally behaves like a tomboy. Liz is very dedicated to IGPX as it was something she fit in with. It is revealed in episode 6, "Cat vs. Dog", that Liz dislikes animals, especially dogs. She is also an avid martial artist, always practicing her Kung Fu (Capoeira in the microseries) and quoting Confucius. Takeshi's contrasting attitude and antics on and off the track are always annoying her, but it is because she feels he's never being 'honest' with her about his feelings. At the end of the series they finally admit their feelings for each other. It is revealed that she is an orphan. She goes into modeling and uses the money to save her orphanage.

Position: Midfielder
Nationality:  American
Age: 16 years old
Gender: Female
Height: 166 cm
Weight: 43 kg
A child prodigy, Amy is Team Satomi's midfielder and battle tactician. She, being the physically weakest of the team, synchronizes with her cybernetically enhanced calico cat,  (Vanilla Yamazaki, Kari Wahlgren), to form a composite personality during IGPX Races. Quiet and sympathetic, Amy will often patch up conflicts between other team members, but her sweetness belies her considerable combat abilities. In season 2, Amy is injured in Satomi's race against White Snow. Andrei replaces her for both Velshtein vs Satomi and Skylark vs. Satomi matches. Throughout the series only Amy could hear Luca's 'voice' while racing with him in her mech. However, at the end of the series, at the beginning of Satomi's first race of the 2051 racing season, it is revealed that now all members of Team Satomi can now hear his voice. In episode 4, "The Ghost", it is revealed that Amy dearly misses her parents, who are always out on business.

Other team members

Position: Team supervision and owner
Nationality:  American
Age: 25 years old
Gender: Female
Michiru Satomi is the granddaughter of the late founding chairman and CEO  of Satomi Heavy Industries. Her family allows her to manage Team Satomi in the faint hope that she can turn this failing franchise into a success story. Satomi may be young, but she is a hard worker and knows she has a special team, including a one-in-a-million pilot like Takeshi.

Position: Coach / Substitute Pilot (Midfielder)
Nationality:  American
Age: 45 years old
Gender: Male
The coach of Team Satomi. Andrei practices an almost "zen" coaching style, in which he appears to be doing very little and motivates the team primarily with cryptic comments and instructions. The other team members do not know about Andrei's past prior to his joining team Satomi, apparently as a result of Andrei's contracts with unknown persons, but a promise that Andrei makes to Takeshi suggests that he could have connections with or be Rocket G. It was recently revealed that he is actually the Rocket himself and used to race with Sir Hamgra of Team Velshtein. He substitutes for Amy after she is injured during Satomi's race against White Snow, and plays Midfielder during their matches against Velshtein and Skylark. Despite being way out of practice, he manages to hold his own during the races and even manages to surprise a few people. It is noted, however, that despite his pacifistic coaching style, he's not above using some 'questionable' tactics on the field; he intentionally spins out his mech and crashes into and destroys two of Velshtein's mechs during the speed round of their race to ensure that Satomi doesn't lose. He has a wife and a daughter, but they had left him; recently, however, due to his more positive lifestyle gained from coaching Team Satomi, they have come back and are living together once more.

Mark Ramsey ( in the Japanese version)

Position: Mechanic
Nationality:  American
Age: 26 years old
Gender: Male
One of the best IGPX mechanics in the game, and he's in it for the love of his craft. In Season 2, he was the first to recognize Max since he read an article about her hacking into government servers until she was threatened with arrest. He is actually the heir to the Ramsey corp the world's largest investment banking group, though he keeps it a closely guarded secret. Mark may care more about his beautiful machines than the team's pilots.
Jesse Martin ( in the Japanese version)

Position: Assistant
Age: 19 years old
Nationality:  American
Gender: Female
Miss Satomi's assistant. She's always the one to cheer up her fellow members of Team Satomi when they are depressed. Once, when Miss Satomi talked about dropping out of the race between Team Satomi and Team Velshtein after Amy got sent to the hospital in the White Snow race, Jesse was the one to convince her otherwise, inspiring Andrei to temporarily replace Amy as Midfielder.

Team Black Egg
The team from Argentina that has a very distinct racing style: They place emphasis on defense rather than offense, preferring agility, smokescreens, and similar tactics to avoid attacks and concentrate on racing. Since the IGPX is descended from a battle sport, this strategy completely bowls over most teams. They unfortunately placed sixth in Season 1. Finishing last place in Season 1 led to their demotion to the IG-2. Their place in the IG-1 is filled by a team promoted from the IG-2, Team White Snow. Their mechs are equipped with hologram projectors and smokescreens, the likes of which scramble enemy opponents when their mechs are in the smoke.

Position: Forward
Nationality:  Argentine
Age: 25
Gender: Male
Height: Unknown
Weight: Unknown
Ricardo Montazio is the forward and leader of Team Black Egg. He believes in defense rather than offense so that his team can win the race. Ricardo is an honest person and a good sport about losing, even though he tries hard. He is also seen to be constantly smiling.

Position: Midfielder
Nationality:  Argentine
Age: 20
Gender: Male
Height: Unknown
Weight: Unknown
Grant McKain is the midfielder for Team Black Egg. Not much is known about him other than the fact that he does not always seem to cooperate very well.

Position: Defender
Nationality Argentine

Age: 17
Gender: Male
Height: Unknown
Weight: Unknown
Glass Jones is the defender for Team Black Egg and a girl-getter. He would rather hang out with females than take the race seriously. Glass underestimates the opponents, including Team Satomi.

Team Edgeraid
From Switzerland, Edgeraid is a team based on teamwork. Edgeraid mechs are equipped with arms that shoot out thin, nearly invisible wires, which they use to manipulate their opponents and to throw each other around the track. Edgeraid's speciality is the Edge Monsoon.

Position: Forward
Nationality:  Switz
Age: 22
Gender: Male
Height: 168 cm
Weight: 58 kg
Bjorn Johannsen is the forward and leader of Team Edgeraid. He takes pride in teamwork and that is what got his team far. Bjorn is not exactly arrogant but he tends to think he knows what he is doing. He is the only other pilot aside from Amy to have an animal copilot.

Position: Midfielder
Nationality:  Switz
Age: 21
Gender: Female
Height: 155 cm
Weight: 42 kg
Bella Demarco is the midfielder for Team Edgeraid with an affinity for piercings. She comes up with good formations for her team to win. Bella also seems to have romantic/lustful feelings towards rival pilot Takeshi Jin.

Position: Defender
Nationality:  Switz
Age: 23
Gender: Male
Height: 175 cm
Weight: 65 kg
Frank Bullit is the defender for Team Edgeraid. He likes to keep his opponents guessing and is sometimes off guard. He is always there for teamwork.

Team Skylark
The all-female team from France. Team Skylark's machines have all been designed to maximize drafting techniques. The Skylark mechs are more of the aggressive melee type where team members Elisa Doolittle and Jessica Darlin help protect team forward Fantine Valjean and use their special attack to take the lead after expending minimal energy for most of the race. Their mechs don't possess any kind of special weaponry or equipment except extremely fast-moving arms, so the pilots focus mainly on their combat prowess. Their drafting techniques may also be out of necessity for their mech's safe handling, since Fantine's mech overheated during their first match with Team Satomi after trading blows with Takeshi for an extended period.

Position: Forward
Nationality:  French
Age: 17
Gender: Female
Height: 169 cm
Weight: 49 kg
Fantine is the forward and leader of Team Skylark. She is all about speed in the races and is unpredictable. She is considered the "princess" of her team and she seems to be attracted to Takeshi along with the fact that they both play Watch World. Takeshi and Fantine were in a relationship starting at Episode 7 and ending at Episode 19 when Fantine and Takeshi broke up before the Season 2 Satomi-Skylark race.

Position: Midfielder
Nationality:  French
Age: 19
Gender: Female
Height: 187 cm
Weight: 64 kg
Jessica is the midfielder for Team Skylark and is very close to Fantine and respects what she wants. She also takes advice from Elissa during races and stops opponents alongside her.

Position: Defender
Age: 23
Gender: Female
Nationality:  French
Height: 185 cm
Weight: 60 kg
Elissa is the defender for Team Skylark and the oldest member. She makes a lot of decisions and gives guidance to Jessica. She also likes to watch as much as she competes.

Team Sledge Mamma
Is another team from the United States that frequently dominates the IGPX, Sledge Mamma is made up of Yamma, Timma, and Dimma, three legendary pilots who are 10-year veterans as well as notoriously merciless fighters, plus former Satomi team member and rookie River Marque. The team despises the young upstarts of Team Satomi and will stop at nothing to put the rookies in their place on the field. Team Sledge Mamma apparently draws the line at cheating and actually hurting and harming people and once helped protect Team Satomi from an attack by overzealous Sledge Mamma fans. Team Sledge Mamma's mechs are armed with detachable fists connected by strands, which allows them to attack enemy mechs from a distance. In the microseries, Sledge Mamma is cybernetically enhanced.

Position: Midfielder (Formerly Forward)
Nationality:  American
Age: 31
Gender: Male
Height: 192 cm
Weight: 71 kg
Yamma was the forward of Team Sledge Mamma and is the leader. He is considered one of the most formidable pilots in the league and gives a fierce intimidation to opponents. An ill-tempered man who is willing to use underhanded methods, he is also skilled in knife fighting. Later, it is shown that Yamma holds a dislike for Takeshi because of his similarities to Cunningham. Yamma has also been revealed to be the oldest pilot in the IG-1, second only to Andrei during his brief return while Amy was out with an injury.

Position: Defender
Nationality:  American
Age: 29
Gender: Male
Height: 205 cm
Weight: 120 kg
Dimma, an African-American, is the defender for Team Sledge Mamma. He knows how to make himself look tough in every race. He stays true to his character but knows how strong his team is. Dimma also seems to cooperate well.

Position: Midfielder (former)
Nationality:  American
Age: 29
Gender: Male
Height: Unknown
Weight: Unknown
Timma is the former midfielder for Team Sledge Mamma. He is loyal to his leader Yamma and had no objections when he was kicked off when River joined. However, Timma was a sharp midfielder during his tenure.

Position: Forward (During their race against Satomi), Midfielder 
Nationality:  Canadian
Age: 17
Gender: Male
Height: 181 cm
Weight: 65 kg
River is the new forward of Team Sledge Mamma and a rival to Takeshi. He used to be the back-up pilot for Team Satomi and was frustrated about being on the bench. River is an outspoken and pushy troublemaker and shows it when he pushed Takeshi into a security machine during a confrontation in the hangar, locking them in for the night. River was offered to replace Liz as defender at one time, but it was the forward position he wanted. He then decided to leave Team Satomi so that he could challenge Takeshi in a friendly rivalry rather than a hateful one.

Team Velshtein
The members of Team Velshtein were last year's IGPX champions, having upset Sledge Mamma last year in the IG-1 of 2048. The Velshtein mechs are also specially designed to discharge a pulse that disrupts the air pressure and creates a high voltage tornado. This attack has been named the Indraga Mano or Ace up the Sleeve. In the commentary of Season 1 DVD, it is stated that the word "Indraga Mano" is just a made-up word created by the writers. Essentially they had to make a crafty translation for the English version, hence "Ace up the Sleeve". In the second season, the move was made illegal by the IGPX League stating that it was starting to get unfair how richer teams were able to buy more expensive equipment than poorer teams such as Team Satomi. Their mechs are also capable of gliding short distances due to small wing-like extensions which are usually retracted. Aside from that, they are extremely skilled pilots, with mechs that have immense reserves of strength for conventional combat. As with all teams, each of the mechs have subtle differences between them, but it is harder to distinguish between the three Velshtein mechs since they are similar in body width, height and depth (as opposed to the Forward mechs and Midfielder Mechs being slimmer) and share the same characteristic twin forward-swept, gold armor plates on their shoulders which to make them look strikingly similar.

Position: Forward
Nationality:  German
Age: 22
Gender: Male
Height: 189 cm
Weight: 75 kg
Alex "Cunningham" is Team Velshtein's forward and an idol to IGPX fans. He has had the MVP title for three years. His nickname "The Ghost" comes from his style that intimidates opponents. Later, it is revealed that he had a rich family but he lived an empty life until the IGPX. He likes to stand in the track when no one is there because it pumps him up. Cunningham is also skilled in swordsmanship like Takeshi but uses fencing. His mech is distinguishable from the other Velshtein mechs thanks to the singular, back-swept armor plate on its arms. Its head also seems to be the most distinguishable amongst the three mechs; Jan's and Dew's mechs have heads that are harder to locate.

Position: Midfielder
Nationality:  French 
Age: 21
Gender: Male
Height: 183 cm
Weight: 75 kg
Jan Michel is the midfielder for Team Velshtein. Although he knows of the risks of Team Satomi, he still believes that his team is still the best. His mech is distinguishable from the other two mechs by its shorter stature and the prominent white cylinder-like protrusion from its gold-plated head.

Position: Defender
Nationality:  Spanish
Age: 21
Gender: Male
Height: 183 cm
Weight: 77 kg
Dew is the defender for Team Velshtein and an observer. He observes team plays and reports that information to his team to give them an edge. He seems to be able to pay attention to minor details. His mech is distinguishable by the almost triangular-like armor plates on its arms, which can also spin to add a devastating edge to Dew's blows.

Team White Snow
This team replaces Team Black Egg in Season 2 after Black Egg finished in last place during the first season. They started in the same place as Team Satomi did in Season 1, coming up from the IG-2 to take a crack at becoming IG-1 champions. Their mechs have the ability to hack into enemy mechs and take total control of their systems, though this requires physical contact with the other mech and was banned by the IGPX League after it was used against Team Satomi. In their first match against Satomi, they score a resounding victory by taking control of the Satomi mechs and forcing them to attack each other. Amy's mech ends up being destroyed from the waist down by a kick from above by Takeshi controlled by Zanak. Amy is sent to the hospital, and is suspended from the next 2 races: Satomi vs Velshtein and Satomi vs Skylark. Team White Snow also has the tendency to sabotage or spy on Team Satomi by hacking into their computer systems thus memorizing all of Team Satomi's plays as shown in the last race. Team White Snow has also combined their mechs into "Snowman", a large behemoth designed to prevent the other team from passing them on the track. It also has many extended, spiked arms.

Position: Forward
Nationality:  Australian
Age: 17
Gender: Male
Height: 172 cm
Weight: 65 kg
Zanak is the one-eyed forward of Team White Snow. He believes in preparation for everything. Even if cheating is involved, Zanak wants it prepared already. He is concerned for his teammates' well-being, and is skilled in kendo like Takeshi. He is actually not the leader of this team, which is different from all the other teams, where they have their Forward as the Team Leader.

Position: Defender
Nationality:  American
Age: 18
Gender: Female
Height: 171 cm
Weight: 58 kg
Judy Raysmith in Japan, is the defender for team White Snow. She is casual in her ways and is close by with her teammate Zanak. She is still herself and will use others in that way. She does her best when playing defense.

Position: Midfielder
Nationality:  Norwegian
Age: 13
Gender: Female
Height: 149 cm
Weight: 39 kg
Max is the shy and reserved midfielder for Team White Snow. She makes up for her verbal communication in communication through computers. Max is loyal to her team and would even cheat for them. It is revealed towards the end of the series that Max is in fact a child prodigy and master programmer.  She had been learning C++ and running her own company when she was a child. She also hacked into government servers and disappeared when they threatened to arrest her. Max, it turns out, orchestrated all of Satomi's troubles as a way for her to understand Takeshi's tactics and find out if she had what it would take to beat him, hinting she might have a crush on him. It is also revealed during the last episode, that she is the actual leader of Team White Snow.

Other characters
Benjamin Bright

As the "voice of IGPX" announcer, Benjamin Bright has become world famous for his color commentary on the sport. He slowly develops a grudging appreciation for the untested rookies of Team Satomi. Though rarely seen in person, Bright can often be seen giving race commentary and IGPX news on the various public TV screens scattered around the city and on the trademark blimp that hovers above the track.

Rules of the IGPX
An IGPX race consists of two teams of three pilots: a forward (usually places first or second), a midfielder (usually places third or fourth), and a defender (usually places fifth or sixth). The overall objective is to make it to the finish line and accumulate more points than the opponent. 1st place receives 15 points; 2nd receives 7 points; 3rd gets 5 points; 4th gets 3 points; 5th gets 2 points and 6th gets 1 point. No points are awarded to pilots who are unable to finish the race.

Lap one is basically a "setup" lap. Teams set up their positions on the track and troubleshoot any problems that the mechs may be having. In the second lap, also known as the "battle round", the teams now fight their way to the finish line. The pit machines, also known as the "running skeletons", are only employed during this lap. Each skeleton is designed to hold two people, one being the mechanic that fixes the mech, and has an open center that allows the mech to be held between the two cockpits while the parts for each mech are stored along the sides for quick replacement. However, the running skeleton can only be called on once for each team throughout the race. In the third lap, pilots are allowed to set their mechs into speed mode. Speed mode allows the mech to achieve maximum speed, and make a quick sprint to the finish line.

Usually in each IGPX season has the champion of the IG-2 is usually brought in to replace the lowest ranking team in the standings but sometimes it grows to more teams usually when there is controversy like in team satomi’s second year in  the IG 1 and when there opportunity.  this will allows the teams at top to stay at the top while they promote the top two teams minus the top to league  IG-1 and for basic structures remain the same while avoiding as much controversy as possible  . Which team Team Satomi replaced is unclear, but at the end of the first half of the series, Team Black Egg was demoted from IG-1 to IG-2 as they were last in the IG-1 standings. Team White Snow was the team that replaced Team Black Egg in the second half of the show.

External links
Production I.G official IGPX page

Immortal Grand Prix